Westgate or West Gate may refer to:

Companies
 Westgate Resorts, a real estate company and timeshare company
 Westgate Department Stores, the department store division of Anglia Regional Co-operative Society in the United Kingdom

Events
 Westgate shopping mall shooting, a 2013 attack on the Westgate mall in Nairobi, Kenya

Places

United Kingdom
 Westgate, County Durham
 Westgate, Gloucester, Gloucestershire
 Westgate, Lincolnshire, a location
 Westgate, Newcastle upon Tyne, Tyne and Wear
 Westgate, Norfolk, a location
 Westgate-on-Sea, Kent
 Westgate, the main street in Guisborough, North Yorkshire
 Westgate, Oxford

United States
 Westgate, Alaska, see List of places in Alaska (W)
 Westgate, Baltimore, Maryland
 Westgate, Georgia, see List of places in Georgia (U.S. state) (S–Z)
 Westgate, Iowa
 Westgate, Los Angeles
 Westgate, Columbus, Ohio
 Westgate, Austin, Texas, a neighborhood in Austin, Texas
 West Gate, Prince William County, Virginia
 Westgate, Florida
 Westgate Las Vegas Resort & Casino in Nevada
 Westgate City Center, Glendale, Arizona
 Westgate Center, in San Jose, California

Other countries
 Westgate, Calgary, a neighbourhood in Calgary, Alberta, Canada
 Westgate, Manitoba, Canada
 Westgate, New Zealand, a suburb of Auckland, New Zealand
 Westgate, NSW is the western approach to Sydney, NSW, Australia
 Westgate, Queensland, Australia
Westgate, Mitchells Plain, a neighbourhood in Cape Town, South Africa.

Schools

Canada
 Westgate Collegiate & Vocational Institute, a high school in Thunder Bay, Ontario
 Westgate Mennonite Collegiate, a private school serving grades 7-12 in Winnipeg, Manitoba

United Kingdom
The Westgate School (disambiguation)

Structures

Historic city gates
 Westgate, Canterbury, England, a medieval gatehouse situated in the Canterbury ward of Westgate
 West Gate, Ipswich, Suffolk
 Westgate, Winchester, a medieval fortified gateway in Winchester, Hampshire

Shopping centres
 Westgate Mall (disambiguation), various shopping centers around the world
 Westgate, Nairobi, Kenya, a shopping mall in the Westlands division of Nairobi
 Westgate, Oxford, a shopping centre in Oxford, England
 Westgate, Singapore

Other structures
 Westgate Hotel, in Newport, United Kingdom
 West Gate Bridge, Melbourne, Australia
 West Gate Freeway, Melbourne, Australia
 Wakefield Westgate railway station, England
 Westgate Tower, Austin, Texas

Other uses
 Westgate (surname), a surname
 Westgate (album), a 2007 album by Mark Seymour
 Westgate (Metro Transit station), a planned light rail stop along the Central Corridor line in Saint Paul, Minnesota
 Westgate (Pacific Electric), a suburban line operated by the Pacific Electric Railway from 1911 to 1940
 Westgate FC, an association football club based in Melbourne, Australia
 , a cargo ship of the US Navy